The UAAP Season 50 basketball tournaments involved 23 teams from the eight member schools that played two rounds of elimination games in the University Athletic Association of the Philippines (UAAP) in the 1987–88 school year. Ateneo de Manila University was the host school for the second time since joining the league in 1978.

The UP Fighting Maroons and the Adamson Lady Falcons were the defending men's and women's champions, while the Ateneo Blue Eaglets have been the juniors' champions since Season 46 (1983).

The games of the senior men's division began on July 18, 1987, while the women's and juniors' games began on July 19. The venue for the opening ceremonies was changed from the Araneta Coliseum to Rizal Memorial Coliseum due to its unavailability, with the ongoing Grand Circus Internationale which opened on July 2.

A special award was given to Professor Candido Bartolome of the University of the Philippines, being the last surviving founder of the UAAP on its 50th anniversary. Fr. Raymond Holscher, Ateneo's athletic director declared the games open.

The Ateneo Blue Eagles defeated the UE Red Warriors in the Finals to take their first UAAP men's basketball championship after transferring from the NCAA in 1978.

The NU Bulldogs ended their six-year losing streak when they defeated the Adamson Falcons and the UP Fighting Maroons for a 2–12 win-loss record.

Teams
All eight member universities of the UAAP fielded teams in the men's and junior divisions. National University did not have a team in the women's division.

Coaches

Coaching changes

Venues
The Rizal Memorial Coliseum in Manila was the primary venue for the men's tournament and for the Finals series of the women's and juniors' tournament. The Loyola Center inside the Ateneo campus in Quezon City was the venue for the women's and boys' tournaments. The Uno High School Gym in Manila was an alternate site for the women's games.

Tournament format
 Double round robin eliminations, with the top two teams advancing to the Finals:
The team with the best win-loss record needs only to win once to clinch the championship;
The second-seeded team needs to beat the #1 seed twice to win the championship.

Men's tournament

Elimination round

Team standings

As a result of a protest filed by Adamson against UST's sophomore forward Fedencio Oblina, the UAAP board found him to be ineligible for failing his NCEE qualifying tests, causing the reversal of four of UST's wins. The Glowing Goldies dropped to 7th place in the standings at 2–7 from their original 6–3 record. The forfeitures benefited Adamson, Ateneo and FEU. Ateneo found themselves on top of the standings with an 8–1 record. Oblina was later handed down a lifetime ban by the UAAP.

Match-up results

Scores
Results on top and to the right of the dashes are for first-round games; those to the bottom and to the left of it are second-round games.

Finals
Number 1 seed Ateneo only has to win once, while number 2 seed UE has to win twice to clinch the championship.

Elimination round games
August 12: Ateneo defeated UE, 102–100 in overtime at the Rizal Memorial Coliseum.
The Blue Eagles led at halftime, 49–44. The score was tied ar 90–all at the end of regulation.
The score was still tied at 100–all with eight seconds remaining in extra time when Jun Reyes was fouled by Conrado Barile. Reyes converted both free throws for an Ateneo win.
Nonoy Chuatico topscored with 24 points for Ateneo, while Verni Villarias had 35 for UE.
September 20: Ateneo won again over UE, 105–102 in their second round game at the Rizal Memorial Coliseum.
They led the Warriors at the half, 60–58.
Jayvee Gayoso led the Eagles in scoring with 26 points, while Jerry Codiñera had 32 for UE.
The UE Warriors were gunning for their 19th championship, while the Blue Eagles had reached the Finals for only the first time since joining the UAAP in 1978. (Ateneo held a twice-to-beat advantage over UE.)

The UE Warriors capitalized on the absence of Danny Francisco with a strong start. The Ateneo starting center was earlier hospitalized for a lung-related illness. The Blue Eagles' Jayvee Gayoso scored the first basket, but the Warriors sped off to a 10–2 run and ended the half with a 51–38 lead.

Despite Jerry Codiñera's foul trouble, the Warriors were able to extend their lead to 83–63 with ten minutes remaining. Amid cheers from supporters in the stands, Ateneo erupted for a 22–2 run. Jett Nieto's three-point shot sparked the rally until the scores were tied at 85-all.

UE coach Roehl Nadurata was ejected from the game in the last 3:03 after complaining against an offensive foul slapped on Conrado Barile. The Warriors were trailing, 86-87. UE's Modesto Hojilla was then called for an unsportsmanlike foul in the ensuing play when he cut into the path of Ateneo's Nonoy Chuatico who was driving for a basket. Chuatico split his charities, but the Blue Eagles still had ball possession as a result of the flagrant foul. A desperation foul by Codiñera with three seconds left in the game sent Eric Reyes to the freethrow line where he also made one out of two shots for the final count of 94-92.

The Ateneo Blue Eagles have won their first UAAP men's championship. In contrast, the UE Warriors have lost in a Finals series after having a wide lead over their opponents for the second straight year. They were defeated by the UP Fighting Maroons in 1986.

Awards

 Most Valuable Player:

Broadcast notes
PTV 4 was the official broadcaster of the UAAP Season 50 Men's basketball games.
Dick Ildefonso, play-by-play
Chot Reyes, analyst
Danny Ochoa, broadcast director

Women's tournament

Elimination round

Team standings

Adamson's wins in the first round were reversed into losses after the board found Irmina de Guzman ineligible for skipping the one-year residency rule. De Guzman had transferred from FEU.

Match-up results

Scores
Results on top and to the right of the dashes are for first-round games; those to the bottom and to the left of it are second-round games.

UST failed to get a sweep when they lost to the Adamson Lady Falcons in the last game of the double round robin eliminations, 67-86. The Lady Goldies struggled early in the game, yielding a 27-44 halftime deficit to Adamson.

A playoff to determine UST's Finals opponent was held between FEU and Ateneo after the Lady Eagles defeated the Lady Tamaraws in the last game of eliminations, 62-61. Both teams ended up with identical 7-5 records.

Playoffs

Second–seed playoff
This is a one-game playoff. The winner advances to the Finals with a twice-to-win disadvantage; the loser is eliminated.

Elimination round games
August 9: FEU defeated Ateneo, 85–73 at the Loyola Center.
The Lady Tamaraws led at halftime, 48–33.
E. Galang topscored with 18 points for FEU, while Peachy Cheng had a season high of 40 points for Ateneo.
September 23: Ateneo got back at FEU in their second round game with a 62–61 win at the Loyola Center.
They led the Lady Tamaraws at the half, 27–22.
Cheng once again led the Eagles in scoring with 24 points, while Galang had 19 for FEU.

Ateneo won the playoff for the second Finals berth over FEU on September 27. The Lady Eagles fielded a team for the first time in the UAAP and had barely been together with three weeks to go before the start of the season. They needed to beat FEU twice in order to qualify to the Finals against season leader UST. They were behind the Lady Tamaraws in the standings with a 5-6 record heading into the last game of the elimination round.

Finals
Number 1 seed UST only has to win once, while number 2 seed Ateneo has to win twice to clinch the championship.

Elimination round games
August 2: UST defeated Ateneo, 84–41 at the Loyola Center.
The Lady Goldies led at halftime, 41–26.
Jho Gutierrez topscored with 17 points for UST, while Mitchie Lazaro had 13 for Ateneo.
September 13: UST won again over Ateneo, 105–40 in their second round game at the Loyola Center.
Duran led the Lady Goldies in scoring with 20 points, while Lazaro had 14 for Ateneo.

The UST Lady Goldies were gunning for their fourth championship, with the Lady Eagles vying for their first on the year that the team was formed. (UST held a twice-to-beat advantage over Ateneo.)

Awards

Juniors' tournament

Elimination round

Team standings

Match-up results

Scores
Results on top and to the right of the dashes are for first-round games; those to the bottom and to the left of it are second-round games.

The Ateneo Blue Eaglets were eliminated from the finals for the first time since the 1982 season after finishing third in the eliminations with a 10–4 record. They finished behind Adamson with only a one game difference, though the Baby Falcons earlier led in the standings with an 11–0 record until the final three games of the second round.

Finals
Number 1 seed FEU only has to win once, while number 2 seed Adamson has to win twice to clinch the championship.

Elimination round games
July 25: Adamson defeated FEU, 68–66 at the Loyola Center.
The Baby Falcons led at halftime, 38–28, but the Baby Tamaraws rallied to close the gap. The game was decided in the last 43 seconds when a fouled Terry James Pearson converted both his free throws to break away from a 66–all deadlock wirh FEU and send his Baby Falcons team to their second-straight victory of the tournament.
Antonio Barrameda topscored with 16 points for Adamson, while Johnny Abarrientos and Sixto Mondarte had 14 apiece for FEU.
September 13: FEU got back at Adamson in their second round game with a 77–74 win at the Loyola Center. The Baby Tamaraws have taken over the lead in the standings after handing the Baby Falcons their second straight loss.
They led Adamson at the half, 44–38.
Abarrientos led FEU in scoring with 24 points, while Robert Talamayan had 23 for the Baby Falcons.

The FEU Baby Tamaraws reclaimed the championship they last won in 1976. The second-seeded Adamson Baby Falcons negated FEU's twice-to-beat advantage by winning, 77–69 to extend the Finals series to a second game. FEU prevailed with an 87–79 win for their seventh title in the junior's tournament.

Awards

Overall championship points

In case of ties, the team with the higher position in any tournament is ranked higher. If both are still tied, they are listed in alphabetical order.

Seniors' division

Juniors' division

References

UAAP basketball tournaments